The 11205 / 06 Lokmanya Tilak Terminus–Karimnagar Express is an Express train belonging to Indian Railways – Central Railway zone that runs between Lokmanya Tilak Terminus & Karimnagar in India.

It operates as train number 11205 from Lokmanya Tilak Terminus to Karimnagar and as train number 11206 in the reverse direction, serving the states of Maharashtra & Telangana.

It was started as Lokmanya Tilak Terminus–Nizamabad Express on 27 October 2013, after 5 years on 26 December 2018 it was extended to Karimnagar and now runs as Lokmanya Tilak Terminus–Karimnagar Express.

Coaches
The 11205 / 06 Lokmanya Tilak Terminus–Karimnagar Express has 1 AC 2 tier, 2 AC 3 tier, 6 Sleeper Class, 11 General Unreserved & 2 SLR (Seating cum Luggage Rake) coaches. It does not carry a pantry car.

As is customary with most train services in India, coach composition may be amended at the discretion of Indian Railways depending on demand.

Rake sharing
The 11205 / 06 Lokmanya Tilak Terminus–Karimnagar Express has a rake sharing arrangement with 11202 / 01 Lokmanya Tilak Terminus–Ajni Express as follows:

 11205 Lokmanya Tilak Terminus–Karimnagar Express leaves Lokmanya Tilak Terminus on Saturday reaching Karimnagar on Sunday.
 11206 Karimnagar–Lokmanya Tilak Terminus Express leaves Karimnagar on Sunday arriving at Lokmanya Tilak Terminus on Monday.

Service

Routing

Traction
Despite electrification of almost 35% of the route, a Diesel Loco Shed, Kalyan-based WDP-4D locomotive powers the train for its entire journey.

References

External links

Transport in Mumbai
Express trains in India
Rail transport in Maharashtra
Rail transport in Telangana